The 2018–19 Vanderbilt Commodores men's basketball team represented Vanderbilt University in the 2018–19 NCAA Division I men's basketball season. They were coached by Bryce Drew in his third season at Vanderbilt. The Commodores played their home games at Memorial Gymnasium in Nashville, Tennessee as members of the Southeastern Conference. They finished the season 9–23, 0–18 to finish in last place in SEC play. They were the first SEC team to go winless in a season since the 1954 Georgia Tech team, and the first team ever in the 18-game conference schedule. They lost in the first round of the SEC tournament to Texas A&M.

On March 22, 2019, the school fired Drew as head coach after three years in Nashville. On April 5, the school hired former NBA player and NBA assistant coach Jerry Stackhouse as head coach.

Previous season
They finished the season 12–20, 6–12 in SEC play to finish in 13th place. They lost in the first round of the SEC tournament to Georgia.

Offseason

Departures

Incoming transfers

2018 recruiting class

Roster

Schedule

|-
!colspan=9 style=| Regular season

|-
!colspan=9 style=| SEC tournament

See also 
 2018–19 Vanderbilt Commodores women's basketball team

References 

Vanderbilt Commodores men's basketball seasons
Vanderbilt